The year 1930 in television involved some significant events.
Below is a list of television-related events in 1930.


Global television events
 May 22 – An audience at Proctor's Theatre in Schenectady, New York becomes the first to see a closed-circuit television signal projected onto a big screen.
 July 14 – For the first time in the United Kingdom, a television drama is broadcast.  The drama is a production of Luigi Pirandello's The Man With the Flower in His Mouth; it is broadcast by the BBC from Baird's studios at 133 Long Acre, London.
 November 5 – Baird television transmissions at Hairdressing Fair of Fashion include the world's first television commercial for the Eugène Method of permanent hair waving.
 December 7 – W1XAV in Boston, Massachusetts broadcasts the first television commercial in the United States, of I.J Fox Furriers during The Fox Trappers.

Births
 January 1 - Ty Hardin, U.S. actor (Bronco) (died 2017)
 January 3 - Robert Loggia, U.S. actor (died 2015)
 January 4  
Sorrell Booke, U.S. actor (The Dukes of Hazzard) (died 1994)
Rosemary Prinz, U.S. actress (As the World Turns)
 January 6 - Vic Tayback, U.S. actor (Alice) (died 1990)
 January 15 - Edwin Sherin, U.S. director (died 2017)
 January 19 - Tippi Hedren, U.S. actress
 January 30 - Don Brockett, U.S. actor (died 1995)
 February 8 - Alejandro Rey, Argentinian-born actor (The Flying Nun) (died 1987)
 February 10 - Robert Wagner, U.S. actor (It Takes a Thief, Switch, Hart to Hart)
 February 27 - Joanne Woodward, U.S. actress
 March 22 - Stephen Sondheim, U.S. composer (died 2021)
 March 30 - John Astin, U.S. actor (The Addams Family)
 April 5 - Mary Costa, actress
 April 7 - Andrew Sachs, German-born British actor (Fawlty Towers) (died 2016)
 April 18 - Clive Revill, actor
 April 19 - Dick Sargent, U.S. actor (Bewitched) (died 1994)
 April 23 - Alan Oppenheimer, U.S. actor
 April 25 - Lynn Hamilton,  U.S. actress (Sanford and Son)
 April 28 - Carolyn Jones, U.S. actress (The Addams Family) (died 1983)
 May 10 - Pat Summerall, American football player and sportscaster (died 2013)
 May 17 - Frank Price, U.S. TV and film executive
 May 20 - Betty DeGeneres, American LGBT rights activist
 May 31 - Clint Eastwood, U.S. director and actor (Rawhide)
 June 12 - Jim Nabors, U.S. actor, singer (The Andy Griffith Show, Gomer Pyle, U.S.M.C.) (died 2017)
 June 19 - Gena Rowlands, U.S. actress
 June 25 - George Murdock, actor (died 2012)
 June 28 - Horacio Gómez Bolaños, Mexican actor (died 1999)
 June 29 - Robert Evans, Actor (died 2019)
 July 14 - Polly Bergen, U.S. actress (died 2014)
 July 17 - Ray Galton, British writer (died 2018)
 August 11 - Paul Soles, actor (died 2021)
 August 16 
Frank Gifford, American football player and sportscaster (died 2015)
Robert Culp, U.S. actor (I Spy) (died 2010)
 August 25
 Graham Jarvis, U.S. actor (died 2003)
 Sean Connery, Actor (died 2020)
 August 28 - 
 Windsor Davies, British comedy actor (It Ain't Half Hot Mum) (died 2019)
 Ben Gazzara, U.S. actor (Run for Your Life) (died 2012)
 September 7 - Sonny Rollins, Saxophonist
 September 11 - Cathryn Damon, U.S. actress (died 1987)
 September 16 - Anne Francis, U.S. actress (Honey West) (died 2011)
 September 23 - Ray Charles, U.S. singer, songwriter, pianist and composer (died 2004)
 September 27 - Bill Carruthers, U.S. television executive (died 2003)
 October 1 - Richard Harris, actor (died 2002)
 October 6 - Lou Cutell, U.S. actor (died 2021)
 October 19 - Fred Facey, U.S. radio and television announcer (died 2003)
 November 3 
 Larry Gelman, U.S. actor (The Bob Newhart Show)
 Lois Smith, U.S. actress
 November 5 - Richard Davalos, U.S. actor (died 2016)
 November 15 - Whitman Mayo, U.S. actor (Sanford and Son) (died 2001)
 November 2 - Peter Hall, English director (died 2017)
 December 4 - Ronnie Corbett, British comedian (died 2016)
 December 9 - Buck Henry, U.S. writer, actor, director (died 2020)
 December 12 - Bill Beutel, American television journalist (died 2006)
 December 17 - Armin Mueller-Stahl, actor
 December 21 - Phil Roman, U.S. animator
 December 24 - Julian Barry, U.S. screenwriter
 December 31 - Renate Hoy, U.S. actress

Deaths
February 19 - Alan Archibald Campbell-Swinton, Scottish electrical engineer who provided the theoretical basis for the electronic television, 66

References